The wild water buffalo (Bubalus arnee), also called Asian buffalo, Asiatic buffalo and wild buffalo, is a large bovine native to the Indian subcontinent and Southeast Asia. It has been listed as Endangered in the IUCN Red List since 1986, as the remaining population totals less than 4,000. A population decline of at least 50% over the last three generations (24–30 years) is projected to continue. The global population has been estimated at 3,400 individuals, of which 3,100 (91%) live in India, mostly in Assam. The wild water buffalo is the most likely ancestor of the domestic water buffalo.

Taxonomy

Bos arnee was the scientific name proposed by Robert Kerr in 1792 who described a skull with horns of a buffalo zoological specimen from Bengal in northern India. The specific name arnee is derived from Hindi arnī, which referred to a female wild water buffalo; the term is related to Sanskrit áraṇya ("forest") and áraṇa ("strange, foreign.") Bubalus arnee was proposed by Charles Hamilton Smith in 1827 who introduced the generic name Bubalus for bovids with large heads, convex-shaped narrow foreheads, laterally bent flat horns, funnel-shaped ears, small dewlaps and slender tails. 
Later authors subordinated the wild water buffalo under either Bos, Bubalus or Buffelus.

In 2003, the International Commission on Zoological Nomenclature placed Bubalus arnee on the Official List of Specific Names in Zoology, recognizing the validity of this name for a wild species. Most authors have adopted the binomen Bubalus arnee for the wild water buffalo as valid for the taxon.

Only a few DNA sequences are available from wild water buffalo populations. Wild populations are considered to be the progenitor of the modern domestic water buffalo, but the genetic variation within the species is unclear, and also how it is related to the domesticated river and Carabao swamp buffaloes.

Characteristics

The wild water buffalo has an ash-gray to black skin. The moderately long, coarse and sparse hair is directed forward from the haunches to the long and narrow head. There is a tuft on the forehead, and the ears are comparatively small. Both sexes carry horns that are heavy at the base and widely spreading up to  along the outer edges, exceeding in size the horns of any other living bovid. The tip of the tail is bushy; the hooves are large and splayed.
It is among the heaviest living wild bovid species, and is slightly smaller than gaur.

Distribution and habitat

The wild water buffalo occurs in India, Nepal, Bhutan, Thailand, and Cambodia, with an unconfirmed population in Myanmar. It has been extirpated in Bangladesh, Laos, Vietnam, and Sri Lanka. It is associated with wet grasslands, swamps, flood plains and densely vegetated river valleys.

In India, it is largely restricted to in and around Kaziranga, Manas and Dibru-Saikhowa National Parks, Laokhowa Wildlife Sanctuary and Bura Chapori Wildlife Sanctuary and in a few scattered pockets in Assam; and in and around D'Ering Memorial Wildlife Sanctuary in Arunachal Pradesh. A small population survives in Balphakram National Park in Meghalaya, and in Chhattisgarh in Indravati National Park and Udanti Wildlife Sanctuary. This population might extend into adjacent parts of Odisha. In the early 1990s, there may still have been about 3,300–3,500 wild water buffaloes in Assam and the adjacent states of northeast India. In 1997, the number was assessed at less than 1,500 mature individuals.

Many surviving populations are thought to have interbred with feral or domestic water buffaloes. In the late 1980s, fewer than 100 wild water buffaloes were left in Madhya Pradesh. By 1992, only 50 animals were estimated to have survived there.

Nepal's only population lives in Koshi Tappu Wildlife Reserve and has grown from 63 individuals in 1976 to 219 individuals in 2009. In 2016, 18 individuals were translocated from Koshi Tappu Wildlife Reserve to Chitwan National Park.

In and around Bhutan's Royal Manas National Park, a small number of wild water buffaloes occur. This is part of the sub-population that occurs in India's Manas National Park. In Myanmar, a few animals live in Hukaung Valley Wildlife Sanctuary.

In Thailand, wild water buffaloes have been reported to occur in small herds of less than 40 individuals. A population of 25–60 individuals inhabited lowland areas of the Huai Kha Khaeng Wildlife Sanctuary between December 1999 and April 2001. This population has not grown significantly in 15 years, and is maybe interbreeding with domestic water buffaloes.

The population in Cambodia is confined to a small area of easternmost Mondulkiri and possibly Ratanakiri Provinces. Only a few dozen individuals remain.

The wild water buffaloes in Sri Lanka are thought to be descendants of the introduced domestic water buffalo. It is unlikely that any true wild water buffaloes remain there today.

Wild-living populations found elsewhere in Asia, Australia, Argentina and Bolivia are feral domestic water buffaloes.

Ecology and behavior
Wild water buffaloes are both diurnal and nocturnal. Clans are led by old cows, even when bulls accompany the group. Several clans form a herd of 30 to 500 animals that gather at resting areas. Adult males form bachelor groups of up to 10 individuals, with older males often being solitary, and spend the dry season apart from the female clans. They are seasonal breeders in most of their range, typically in October and November. However, some populations breed year round. Dominant males mate with the females of a clan who subsequently drive them off. Their gestation period is 10 to 11 months, with an inter-birth interval of one year. They typically give birth to a single offspring, although twins are possible. Age at sexual maturity is 18 months for males, and three years for females. The maximum known lifespan is 25 years in the wild. In the wild in Assam, the herd size varies from three to 30 individuals.
 
They are probably grazers by preference, feeding mainly on graminoids when available, such as Bermuda grass, and Cyperus sedges, but they also eat other herbs, fruits, and bark, as well as browsing on trees and shrubs. They also feed on crops, including rice, sugarcane, and jute, sometimes causing considerable damage.

Tigers and mugger crocodiles prey on adult wild water buffaloes, and Asian black bears have also been known to kill them.

Threats
A population reduction by at least 50% over the last three generations seems likely given the severity of the threats, especially hybridization; this population trend is projected to continue into the future. The most important threats are:
 interbreeding with feral and domestic water buffaloes in and around protected areas;
 hunting, especially in Thailand, Cambodia, and Myanmar;
 habitat loss of floodplain areas due to conversion to agriculture and hydropower development;
 degradation of wetlands due to invasive species such as stem twiners and lianas;
 diseases and parasites transmitted by domestic livestock;
 interspecific competition for food and water between wild water buffaloes and livestock.

Conservation
Bubalus arnee is included in CITES Appendix III, and is legally protected in Bhutan, India, Nepal, and Thailand.

In 2017, 15 wild water buffaloes were reintroduced into Chitwan National Park in Nepal to establish a second viable sub-population in the country.

References

External links

 IUCN Asian Wild Cattle Specialist Group: Water buffalo (Bubalus arnee) 
 Wild Cattle Conservation Project
 Animal Info: Wild water buffalo
 Wildlife Trust of India February 2006: Wild buffalo faces extinction
 The Hindu February 2006: Project to conserve wild Asian buffalo

Water buffalo
Mammals of Bangladesh
Mammals of Bhutan
Mammals of Myanmar
Mammals of Cambodia
Mammals of India
Mammals of Nepal
Mammals of Thailand
Mammals described in 1792
Symbols of Chhattisgarh

br:Bubalus